Emily Elizabeth Douglas (born March 24, 1982) is the founder and Executive Director of Grandma's Gifts a co-founder of Experience Management Institute.

Grandma's Gifts is a charity organization that works to provide goods and services to children and families in Appalachia.

Education
Douglas attended Worthington Kilbourne High School  in Worthington, Ohio and received a bachelor's degree in political science from Miami University in Oxford, Ohio in 2004. She was a member of the sorority Kappa Delta. She holds a Master of Labor and Human Resources degree and a Master of Business Administration degree from the Ohio State University.

Grandma's Gifts
In 1993, Emily Douglas founded Grandma's Gifts in memory of her grandmother, Norma Ackison, who died of breast and lung cancer in 1991 at the age of 60. One of 11 children, Ackison was an infant when her father died. Douglas stated that when she was a child, she would accompany her grandmother to the store to purchase canned goods and clothes for veterans. As a six-year-old, Douglas believed the goods were for her. Ackinson died when Douglas was eleven years old.

In the first year of Grandma's Gifts, Douglas wrote letters to her parents' friends who reportedly donated $300 to the cause. That year, she purchased Christmas presents and clothes for four impoverished children in Lawrence County, Ohio.

Douglas has traveled and spoken to more than two million adults and children across the United States about community service, youth activism, service learning, Appalachia, literacy and her organization. She has testified before the Ohio General Assembly and the United States Congress. She has appeared on The Oprah Winfrey Show and has received multiple awards for her work as a youth activist and young adult social entrepreneur.

Career
Emily is the co-founder of Experience Management Institute where she helps business, non-profits, educational organizations, school districts, and more build more human workplaces by improving their HR policies, practices, and structures. 

She also keeps the K–12 Talent Manager blog for Education Week, the world largest education focused newspaper, where she writes about strategic human resources, process improvement, leadership, and change management in education.

In 2014, Anthony Salcito, Vice President of Microsoft Education, named Emily a "Daily Hero in Education".

Selected awards
A list, by year, of the awards and recognitions presented to Grandma's Gifts or Emily Douglas on behalf of the organization and her work in education, health, and leadership.
2019
Most Beautiful Women 2019 by People Magazine
2017
Special Recognition Award, American Association of School Personnel Administrators (AASPA) 
2015
Diversity Business Award, The Ohio State University Fisher College of Business Office of Diversity and Inclusion
2015
20 Outstanding Women, Sunny 95
2013
Global Hero in Education by Microsoft Corporation/Anthony Salcito Edventures
2011
HR Game Changer by Workforce Magazine
2010
Siena Medal from Theta Phi Alpha Fraternity
American City Business Journals's Forty Under 40 award
2009
Glamour Magazine's Sally Hanson Best of You finalist
2008
L'Oreal Paris Women of Worth Finalist
People Magazine full page article, "Helping Kids in Appalachia"
2007
Hannity's America as the Hero of the Week, Fox News
The Honorable Order of Cincinnatus
2006
Volvo For Life Awards, Semi-Finalist
Featured as a guest speaker on Senator Bill Bradley's Sirius Satellite Radio Show, American Voices
2003
International SERTOMA, Service to Mankind Award
Tri-State/Regional, Ohio, & Powell SERTOMA, Service to Mankind Award
American Profiles, Hometown Hero
2002
Miami University, Young Entrepreneur of the Year
Temple Award for Creative Altruism from the Institute of Noetic Sciences
Seventeen Magazine Community Service Grand Prize Winner
2001
Family Circle Magazine, Halo Award
Selected as a Giraffe by the Giraffe Heroes Project, as a person who all sticks their neck out for the common good
2000
The American Institute for Public Service, Jefferson Award
The Hitachi Foundation's, Yoshiyama Award for Exemplary Service to the Community
Selected as a Paramount/UPN Network Millennium Mentor
Recipient of the Steak Escape Curious Kid Grant
1999
National Child Labor Committee, Lewis Hine Award
President's Service Award, The highest non-military award given to a US citizen for public service
The Caring Institute, National Youth Caring Award
Volunteer Ohio, Outstanding Youth Volunteer of the Year Award
ReACT Take Action Award
1998
Freedoms Foundation, George Washington Honor Medal
National Institute for Public Service Best Practice Model
Appeared on The Oprah Winfrey Show as one of Oprah's Angels, in recognition of Grandma's Gifts
1997
The Columbus Dispatch's Community Service Award
Worthington Optimist Club Award Recipient
 Columbus Parks and Recreation Kidspeak, Community Service Award
1996
Prudential Spirit of Community Award, National Awardee
Prudential Spirit of Community Award, State Awardee

References

Living people
1982 births
People from Powell, Ohio
Miami University alumni
People from Columbus, Ohio